Wiggert van Daalen (22 February 1895 – 27 November 1968) was a Dutch footballer. He played in one match for the Netherlands national football team in 1925.

References

External links
 

1895 births
1968 deaths
Dutch footballers
Netherlands international footballers
Footballers from Haarlem
Association football defenders
HFC Haarlem players